Couze is an Auvergnat word meaning torrent. It may refer to the following places in France:

Watercourses 
 Couze (Corrèze), a river in Corrèze, a tributary of the Corrèze
 Couze (Vézère), a river in Corrèze, a tributary of the Vézère
 Couze (Dordogne), a river in Dordogne, a tributary of the Dordogne
 Couze (Haute-Vienne), a river in Haute-Vienne, a tributary of the Gartempe
 Couze Chambon, a river in Puy-de-Dôme, a tributary of the Allier
 Couze Pavin, also known as the Couze d'Issoire or Couze de Besse, a river in the centre of France, a tributary of the Allier
 Couze de Valbeleix, a tributary of the Couze Pavin

Inhabited places

Corrèze department 
 Lissac-sur-Couze, a commune

Dordogne department 
 Couze, a former commune, now part of Couze-et-Saint-Front
 Couze-et-Saint-Front, a commune
 Port-de-Couze, in the commune of Lalinde, on the right bank of the Dordogne, opposite Couze-et-Saint-Front

Haute-Vienne department 
 Saint-Symphorien-sur-Couze, a commune

Puy-de-Dôme department 
 Ardes (also known as Ardes-sur-Couze), a commune
 Le Breuil-sur-Couze, a commune
 Saint-Cirgues-sur-Couze, a commune

See also 

 Saint-Thibaud-de-Couz, a commune in Savoie department, France
 Saint-Jean-de-Couz, a commune in Savoie department, France